Caryapundy Station most commonly known as Caryapundy or Caryapundy Swamp is a pastoral lease that once operated as a cattle station in the channel country of outback New South Wales.

Geography 

The tender was accepted for the run named Caryapundy by J. C. Myers in 1872. Myers was also had his tenders accepted for other runs such as Bollwarry, Mount Wood, Teriwinda and Torrens Creek.

In 1873 the  unstocked property was put up for auction by the Minister of Lands.

The property was put up for sale as part of five blocks owned by Mr. O'Connor. Caryapundy, Conulpie, Bolwarry, Omura No. 5 and Omura No. 6 were all for sale and advertised as being of Burke and Wills track and well watered by the Bulloo River, Tongowoko, Torrens and other creeks. At the time the area was made up of grassed downs and saltbush country.

By 1892 the property was in the hands of Sidney Kidman who moved 10,000 sheep and 1,000 head of cattle from the station, still owned by the Kidman Brothers in 1899, Sidney Kidman described it as "one of the worst in New South Wales, the  might carry 230 cattle but no more, much of it is a claypan that will never carry feed".

Caryapundy Swamp
The swamp is a wetland that partly lies within the station boundaries. The area is flooded about once every ten years but is also prone to drought. The area flooded in 2010 after a long drought and an estimated 35,000 pelican nests were found within the swamp area.

The Narriearra Caryapundy Swamp National Park was established in 2021.

See also
List of ranches and stations

References

Stations (Australian agriculture)
Pastoral leases in New South Wales
1872 establishments in Australia
Far West (New South Wales)